Vostani Serbije ("Arise, Serbia"; ;  Ustani Srbijo), also known as Pesna na insurekciju Serbijanov ("A poem on the insurrection of the Serbs"), is a Serbian patriotic song, originally a poem written by Dositej Obradović (1739–1811), published in Vienna in 1804, "dedicated to Serbia and her brave warriors and sons and to their leader Georgije Petrović" at the beginning of the First Serbian Uprising that transformed into the Serbian Revolution against the Ottoman Empire.  Obradović, delighted, he happily and sincerely greeted the Serb uprising with this special, patriotic poem. Obradović extensively used the concept of "Mother Serbia" in his works, including this poem. Of his poems, Vostani Serbije is the most patriotic. In it, he calls on a new Serbia, with overtones of memory on the Serbian Empire which had been long gone. Obradović became the first Minister of Education of Revolutionary Serbia.

Bože pravde was the anthem of the Kingdom of Serbia until 1918 when the Kingdom of Serbs, Croats and Slovenes was formed. In 1992, Vostani Serbije and March on the Drina were proposed as the anthem of Serbia along with Bоže pravde. The latter, promulgated by then-ruling Socialist Party of Serbia, even received a plurality of popular vote on referendum, but it never got officially adopted, until 2004.

Ahead of the 2000 parliamentary election in Serbia, an altered version of the song was used in campaigns (...you have slept enough, and joked enough, now wake up, and awaken the Serbs, to vote!).

It is one of the best known patriotic songs in the country, and for some time it was considered as a potential national anthem following the replacement of the old Yugoslav anthem Hej Sloveni following the break-up of Yugoslavia. The song was set to music written by Vartkes Baronijan, Z. Vauda and Ljuba Manasijević.

Lyrics

References

External links 

 Vostani - Serbije instrumental

1804 songs
Serbian patriotic songs